Pyrosoma atlanticum is a pelagic species of marine colonial tunicate in the class Thaliacea found in temperate waters worldwide. The name of the genus comes from the Greek words pyros meaning 'fire' and soma meaning 'body', referring to the bright bioluminescence sometimes emitted. The specific epithet atlanticum refers to the Atlantic Ocean, from where the first specimen of the species was collected for scientific description; it was described in 1804 by François Péron, a French naturalist.

Description

The constituent zooids form a rigid tube, which may be pale pink, yellowish, or bluish. One end of the tube is narrower and is closed, while the other is open and has a strong diaphragm. The outer surface or test is gelatinised and dimpled with backward-pointing, blunt processes. Along the side of the branchial sac runs the endostyle, which produces mucus filters. Water is moved through the gill slits into the centre of the cylinder by cilia pulsating rhythmically. Plankton and other food particles are caught in mucus filters in the processes as the colony is propelled through the water. P. atlanticum is bioluminescent and can generate a brilliant blue-green light when stimulated.

Distribution and habitat
P. atlanticum is found in temperate waters in all the world's oceans, usually between 50°N and 50°S. It is most plentiful at depths below 250 m (800 ft). Colonies are pelagic and move through the water column. They undergo a large diurnal migration, rising toward the surface in the evening and descending around dawn. Large colonies may rise through a vertical distance of 760 m (2,500 ft) daily, and even small colonies a few millimetres long can cover vertical distances of 90 m (300 ft).

Biology
A study in the Indian Ocean comparing different zooplankton organisms found that colonies of P. atlanticum were the most efficient grazers of particles above 10 µm in diameter, catching a higher proportion of the particles than other grazers. This implies the species uses high biomass intake as a strategy, rather than investing in energy-conservation mechanisms.

Growth occurs by new rings of zooids being budded off around the edge of the elongating colony. A pair of luminescent organs is on either side of the inlet siphon of each zooid. When stimulated, these turn on and off, causing rhythmic flashing. No neural pathway runs between the zooids, but each responds to the light produced by other individuals, and even by light from other nearby colonies.

P. atlanticum remains as one of the least studied planktonic grazers, according to a 2021 study. In the study, the researchers took samples of the pyrosome's microbiome. The results of the study found that a possible source of bioluminescence in P. atlanticum is the abundance of Photobacterium in its microbiome. However, there is still debate, as a 2020 study found a potential endogenous pyrosome luciferase in the organism's transcriptome homologous to Renilla luciferase (RLuc). Further study of the luciferase showed that it reacted with coelenterazine to produce light, much like RLuc.

Ecology
Five specimens of the penaeid shrimp Funchalia were found living inside colonies of P. atlanticum. Other amphipods also lived there, including the hyperiids Phronima and Phronimella spp.

Predators of P. atlanticum include various bony fishes, such as the spiky oreo, the big-eyed cardinalfish, and the pelagic butterfish, dolphins, and whales such as the sperm whale and giant beaked whale.

Synonyms

 Dipleurosoma ellipticum Brooks, 1906 – genus transfer and junior synonym
 Pyrosoma atlanticum dipleurosoma Metcalf & Hopkins, 1919 – junior synonym
 Pyrosoma atlanticum echinatum Metcalf & Hopkins, 1919 – junior synonym
 Pyrosoma atlanticum f. elegans Lesueur, 1815 – junior synonym
 Pyrosoma atlanticum hawaiiense Metcalf & Hopkins, 1919 – junior synonym
 Pyrosoma atlanticum intermedium Metcalf & Hopkins, 1919 – junior synonym
 Pyrosoma atlanticum paradoxum Metcalf & Hopkins, 1919 – junior synonym
 Pyrosoma atlanticum triangulum Neumann, 1913 – junior synonym
 Pyrosoma atlanticum var. giganteum Lesueur, 1815 – junior synonym
 Pyrosoma atlanticum var. levatum Seeliger, 1895 – junior synonym
 Pyrosoma atlanticum var. tuberculosum Seeliger, 1895 – junior synonym
 Pyrosoma benthica Monniot C. & Monniot F., 1966 – junior synonym
 Pyrosoma elegans Lesueur, 1813 – junior synonym
 Pyrosoma ellipticum (Brooks, 1906) – junior synonym
 Pyrosoma giganteum Lesueur, 1815 – junior synonym
 Pyrosoma giganteum var. atlanticum Péron, 1804 – status change
 Pyrosoma rufum Quoy & Gaimard, 1824 – junior synonym
 Pyrosoma triangulum Neumann, 1909 – junior synonym

See also
 Jelly-falls

References

External links
 

Thaliacea
Fauna of the Atlantic Ocean
Fauna of the Indian Ocean
Fauna of the Pacific Ocean
Bioluminescent animals
Animals described in 1804
Taxa named by François Péron